The Festival of Festivals in Saint Petersburg is Russia’s largest non-competitive festival of recent outstanding works of international and Russian cinema. It is held annually in June, during Saint Petersburg's White Nights Festival.

History
The festival was established in 1993. Past guests of the festival include Bob Rafelsson (film director), Meryl Streep (actress), François Ozon (film director), and others.

Description

The Festival of Festivals—The main screening section. All films featured in this section are chosen from other international film festivals and are considered the best of the best films of each particular year.

New Russian Cinema—Every year's best Russian films.

Short Films—The best short films created by young directors from around the world.

Unifilm—The year's best children's films.

The festival also includes a Retrospectives screening section as well as a special screening section, whose themes change every year.

Prizes 

Although the festival is non-competitive, it does award a number of special prizes, including:

Grand Prix – Gold or Golden Gryphon (Griffon) - Awarded to the film rated highest by guests and participants

Silver Gryphon - Awarded to the film rated highest by audiences

Bronze Gryphon - Awarded to the best experimental film

The Nikolay Ovsyannikov Prize - Awarded for the best debut 

Prize of the City of St. Petersburg - Awarded for contributions to world cinema made by a director whose film is featured in this year’s festival

Prize of the Board - Awarded to the screening section deemed to be this year’s best

Prize for Talent and National Recognition - Awarded to exceptional actors, actresses, and directors

Footnotes

References

External links
Festival of Festivals International Film Festival (archived 2019)

Film festivals in Russia
1993 establishments in Russia
Culture in Saint Petersburg
festivals in Saint Petersburg
Summer events in Russia